Guy Bulpitt (born 16 April 1968) is a former English cricketer.  Bulpitt was a right-handed batsman who bowled slow left-arm orthodox.  He was born in Stafford, Staffordshire.

Bulpitt made his debut for Staffordshire in the 1998 MCCA Knockout Trophy against the Leicestershire Cricket Board.  Bulpitt played Minor counties cricket for Staffordshire from 1998 to 2004, which included 37 Minor Counties Championship matches and 20 MCCA Knockout Trophy matches.  In 2001, he made his List A debut against the Worcestershire Cricket Board in the Cheltenham & Gloucester Trophy.  He made 6 further appearances in List A cricket, the last coming against Lancashire in the 2004 Cheltenham & Gloucester Trophy.  In his 7 List A matches, he took 8 wickets at an average of 23.00, with best figures of 3/39.

References

External links
Guy Bulpitt at ESPNcricinfo
Guy Bulpitt at CricketArchive

1968 births
Living people
Sportspeople from Stafford
English cricketers
Staffordshire cricketers